Le Pichet is a French restaurant in Seattle, in the U.S. state of Washington.

Description 
Fodor's has described the restaurant's menu as "heartbreakingly" French and said, "Slate tabletops, a tile floor, and a rolled-zinc bar will transport you out of Downtown Seattle and into the charming 6th arrondissement." The menu has included pâtés, ham and cheese sandwiches on baguettes, sausages, fish, steak tartare, and roast chicken.

History 
Jim Drohman is the chef as of 2014.

Reception 
Thrillist says, "The regional and classic style of French food at this Pike Place restaurant has made it a prominent fixture in the area. With an all day charcuterie menu, wine list, full bar, and diner menu there is always something worth stopping in to try." In 2018, Aimee Rizzo of The Infatuation said, "Le Pichet is one of our favorite places for French food." In 2018, Time Out said: 

In 2022, The Seattle Times said, "Over the years, [Anthony] Bourdain often gave Le Pichet or Café Presse a shoutout when he visited Seattle."

See also 

 List of French restaurants

References

External links 

 
 Le Pichet at the Food Network
 Le Pichet at Pike Place Market
 Le Pichet at Zomato

French restaurants in Seattle